Archernis fulvalis is a moth in the family Crambidae. It was described by George Hampson in 1899. It is found in India (Sikkim) and Sri Lanka.

References

Moths described in 1899
Spilomelinae
Moths of Asia